The Japoma Stadium is a 50,000-capacity all-seater multi-purpose stadium in Douala, Cameroon. It is part of a sports complex that also consists of an indoor arena for basketball, handball, futsal and volleyball, tennis courts and an 8-lane Olympic-size swimming pool, as well as conference and commercial centres, a hotel and a parking lot. The stadium also has an athletic track.

The Japoma Stadium costed around $232 million, with 85% of the project financed by Turkish Türk Eximbank.

It hosted some matches of the 2021 Africa Cup of Nations.

Construction
The construction of the Japoma Stadium began on February 21, 2017 and is completed. The stadium was designed by British firm AECOM and management of the construction has been entrusted to Leonardo Cameroun sarl, which belongs to Italian Leonardo srl.

References

External links 

  Japoma Sports Complex weaving in Cameroonian craft traditions ahead of Nations Cup
 ENGINEERING NEWS AECOM cuts stadium design and build to a record two years at Japoma
 Sustainable legacy the goal for Cameroon’s minimalist sports complex 
 Japoma Sport Complex - Leonardo srl

Athletics (track and field) venues in Cameroon
Cameroon
Sport in Douala
Buildings and structures in Douala
Multi-purpose stadiums in Cameroon
Football venues in Cameroon